Raphael Patrick Burke (born 30 September 1943) is an Irish former Fianna Fáil politician who served as Minister for Foreign Affairs from June 1997 to October 1997, Minister for Justice from 1989 to 1992, Minister for Communications from 1987 to 1991, Minister for Industry and Commerce from 1988 to 1989, Minister for Energy from 1987 to 1988, Minister for the Environment from March 1982 to December 1982 and 1980 to 1981 and Minister of State at the Department of Industry, Commerce and Energy from 1979 to 1980. He served as a Teachta Dála (TD) from 1973 to 1997.

Early life
Burke was born in Dublin. He was educated at O'Connell School, he went on to study at University College Cork, before becoming an auctioneer. Burke's political career commenced when he was elected to Dublin County Council for Fianna Fáil in 1967. He was chairman of the council from 1985 to 1987.

Career
Burke was elected to Dáil Éireann at the 1973 general election for the Dublin County North constituency, succeeding his father Patrick Burke, who had held the seat for 29 years. Ray Burke represented this constituency and its successor Dublin North until his resignation almost twenty-five years later.

After Fianna Fáil's landslide victory at the 1977 general election, Burke was appointed Minister of State at the Department of Industry and Commerce. He supported George Colley in the Fianna Fáil leadership contest of 1979, but after Colley's opponent Charles Haughey won out, Haughey retained Burke in his government position. Burke was subsequently a staunch and vocal defender of Haughey during a number of internal heaves against the latter's leadership of the party. In October 1980, Burke was promoted to Minister for the Environment, a position he held until June 1981 and again in the short-lived Fianna Fáil government of 1982. After Fianna Fáil returned to power at the 1987 general election, Burke served as Minister for Energy, where he made controversial changes to the legislation governing oil and gas exploration. In 1988, he was appointed Minister for Industry, Commerce and Communications.

Following the formation of the Fianna Fáil–Progressive Democrats coalition in 1989, he was appointed as Minister for Justice and Minister for Communications in the government of Charles Haughey. When Albert Reynolds succeeded Haughey in 1992, he did not re-appoint Burke to the cabinet. Following the 1997 general election, Fianna Fáil was back in office, and Burke was appointed Minister for Foreign Affairs, by new Taoiseach Bertie Ahern.

Corruption allegations
Within months of his appointment as Minister for Foreign Affairs, allegations resurfaced that Burke had received IR£80,000 from a property developer regarding the former Dublin County Council. Burke denied the allegations but resigned from the cabinet and from the Dáil, on 7 October 1997, after just four months in office. This allegation led to the setting up of the Planning Tribunal chaired by Justice Feargus Flood. In an interim report of the subsequent Flood Tribunal, Flood judged Burke to be "corrupt".

After Burke's re-election in 1989, he had made it clear in interviews that he believed that the national broadcaster Raidió Teilifís Éireann (RTÉ) was biased against him and Fianna Fáil in its election coverage, and several RTÉ employees reported that while off-air at RTÉ's election coverage, he remarked "I'm going to fucking screw RTÉ". After the election he was appointed Minister for Justice, yet retained the Communications brief, thus holding two portfolios which had never before been simultaneously held by the same Minister.

Burke was responsible for controversial legislation that severely limited RTÉ's ability to collect advertising revenue, and allowed for the establishment of a series of local radio stations and one independent national radio station, Century Radio. RTÉ were ordered to provide a national transmission service for Century Radio at a price that RTÉ complained was far below the economic cost of providing such a service. For example, they were required by the service level agreement to have engineers on standby covering the entire country 24 hours a day, when the final payment for the entire transmission service was roughly equal to the salary for just one engineer.

Nevertheless, Century Radio failed to gain significant audience share and closed in 1991. An interim report of the Flood Tribunal found as fact that the backers of Century Radio had paid large bribes to Burke to secure favourable ministerial decisions. One of the local stations established was 98FM and in 2006 its owner, businessman Denis O'Brien won a record €750,000 damages from the Irish Daily Mirror which had claimed that O'Brien had paid a bribe of IR£30,000 to Burke to secure a licence for the station.

Prison time
In July 2004, Burke pleaded guilty to making false tax returns. The charges arose from his failure to declare for tax purposes the payments that he had received from the backers of Century Radio. On 24 January 2005, he was sentenced to six months in prison for these offences, making him one of the most senior Irish politicians to serve time in prison. He was released in June 2005, after four and a half months, earning a 25% remission of sentence because of good behaviour. He served his time in Arbour Hill Prison in Dublin.

Retirement
Burke has maintained a low profile since completing his prison sentence but attended the June 2006 state funeral of Charles Haughey, his political patron. Several former associates of Burke, from his days as a member of Dublin County Council, continue to be the subjects of tribunals of inquiry set up to investigate irregularities in the planning process in Dublin.

Burke is entitled to two public service pensions, one as a former TD at the maximum rate for over 20 years' service, and another as a former Minister. His barrister at his 2005 sentencing hearing stated these were his only income. As well as general criticism that such pensions are overly generous, Burke's continued receipt of these pensions while in prison and after his condemnation in the Flood report attracted criticism. Their combined income value was €66,000 in 2003 and €103,838 in 2011.

See also
Mahon Tribunal
List of members of the Oireachtas imprisoned since 1923

References

External links
The Flood Tribunal
Wikisource: Cole Report into the granting of Irish passports to Khalid bin Mahfouz and associated persons

1943 births
Living people
Councillors of Dublin County Council
Fianna Fáil TDs
Irish people convicted of tax crimes
Irish politicians convicted of crimes
Members of the 20th Dáil
Members of the 21st Dáil
Members of the 22nd Dáil
Members of the 23rd Dáil
Members of the 24th Dáil
Members of the 25th Dáil
Members of the 26th Dáil
Members of the 27th Dáil
Members of the 28th Dáil
Ministers for the Environment (Ireland)
Ministers for Foreign Affairs (Ireland)
Ministers for Justice (Ireland)
Ministers of State of the 21st Dáil
Politicians from Dublin (city)
Ministers for Enterprise, Trade and Employment